The ponds of the Lower Harz Pond and Ditch System in Germany consist of around 20 small and larger reservoirs. Most were laid out roughly from the beginning of the 17th century between the Upper Lude, Großer Auerberg, Straßberg, Neudorf and Silberhütte. Several of the pond barrages are classified as dams. The dam of the Gräfiggründer Teich is also the second oldest reservoir in Germany.

The ponds are located in the mining fields of Straßberg, Silberhütte, Birnbaum and Neudorf.

Table of ponds

Footnotes

Sources 
 Wilfried Strenz, Historisch-geographische Forschungen in der DDR
 Robert Wouters (Hrsg. Damnbetrieb Sachsen-Anhalt), Damn in Sachsen-Anhalt, 
 Wilfried Ließmann: Historischer Bergbau im Harz,

External links 
 Straßberg
 harzlife.de
 harzkaleidoskop.de

!
Reservoirs in Germany

de:Liste der Teiche des Unterharzer Teich- und Grabensystems#Bergbau in Straßberg und Neudorf